Walter George "Wally, Pop" Monson (November 29, 1908 – January 9, 1988) was a Canadian ice hockey player who competed in the 1932 Winter Olympics.

In 1932 he was a member of the Winnipeg Hockey Club, which won the Olympic gold medal for Canada. He played all six matches and scored seven goals.

After playing amateur ice hockey with the Saint John Beavers and the Pittsburgh Yellow Jackets, Monson went to the United Kingdom to play professional ice hockey with the Harringay Racers between 1936 and 1940. After World War II, Monson returned to Winnipeg where he coached the Winnipeg Monarchs to the Memorial Cup in 1946.

He was inducted into the British Ice Hockey Hall of Fame in 1955.

Awards and achievements
Olympic Gold Metalist (1932)
MJHL First All-Star Team Coach (1953)
Inducted into the British Ice Hockey Hall of Fame in 1955
"Honoured Member" of the Manitoba Hockey Hall of Fame

External links

Walter Monson's biography at databaseOlympics.com
Walter Monson's biography at Manitoba Hockey Hall of Fame
Walter Monson's biography at British Ice Hockey Hall of Fame

1908 births
1988 deaths
British Ice Hockey Hall of Fame inductees
Canadian ice hockey centres
Harringay Racers players
Ice hockey people from Winnipeg
Ice hockey players at the 1932 Winter Olympics
Medalists at the 1932 Winter Olympics
Olympic gold medalists for Canada
Olympic ice hockey players of Canada
Olympic medalists in ice hockey
Winnipeg Hockey Club players
Canadian expatriate ice hockey players in England